The following is a list of Malayalam films released in the year 1974.

Dubbed movies

References

 1974
1974
Malayalam